Jo Davis may refer to:

 Jo Ann Davis, politician
Jo Davis (EastEnders)

See also
Joanne Davis, activist
Joe Davis (disambiguation)